Michael Leslie Howard (born 17 October 1999) is an English professional footballer who plays as a striker for Warrington Town.

Club career

Preston North End 
Howard joined Preston North End at the age of 11 and progressed through the ranks up to the Under-18s.

On 28 November 2017, he featured in a 2–1 defeat to Bury in the Lancashire Senior Cup quarter-final.

In February 2018, Howard signed an 18-month professional contract with the option of a further year, and was immediately loaned out.

Cork City 
On 20 February 2018, League of Ireland Premier Division club Cork City announced the signing of Howard on loan for the remainder of the season. He said he was influenced to make the move by several teammates who had previously played for the club, most notably Daryl Horgan.

On 24 February, Howard made his league debut as an 88th minute substitute for Kieran Sadlier in a 2–0 win against Waterford.

He was released by Preston at the end of the 2018–19 season.

Morecambe 
Howard signed for EFL League Two club  Morecambe on 28 May 2019. His first goal came against Wolverhampton Wanderers in the EFL Trophy, just two games into his spell at the club.  

In February 2020 he joined Marine on loan until the end of the 2019–20 season.

Howard was released at the end of the 2019–20 season.

In March 2022 he signed for Northern Premier League club Warrington Town on dual registration terms, having played a key role in Skelmersdale United’s push for promotion in the North West Counties League Premier Division, firing 27 goals in 47 appearances in all competitions.

Career statistics

References

External links 
 Profile at PNEFC.net

1999 births
Living people
Association football forwards
English footballers
Cork City F.C. players
Preston North End F.C. players
Hednesford Town F.C. players
English Football League players
League of Ireland players
Stalybridge Celtic F.C. players
Morecambe F.C. players
Marine F.C. players
Skelmersdale United F.C. players
Warrington Town F.C. players